Bat Shlomo (lit. Salomon's Daughter) is a moshav in northern Israel. Located on the southern slopes of Mount Carmel near Binyamina and Zikhron Ya'akov, it originally was built on 8,068 dunams of land.

History
The village was established in 1889 as a daughter-settlement of Zichron Ya'akov, funded by Baron Rothschild,  on land purchased from the Arab village of Umm al-Tut. It was named after Betty von Rothschild, the daughter of Salomon Mayer von Rothschild (the Baron's uncle and grandfather). According to a census conducted in 1922 by the British Mandate authorities, Bat Shlomo had a population of 66 inhabitants, consisting of 53 Jews and 13 Muslims. 
By 1947 it had a population of 100. In 1951 a moshav was established by Transylvanian and Yemenite immigrants adjacent to the original village.

Economy
The moshav was a major grape supplier to the Carmel Winery until the 1970s, when it started producing loquats. In 2010 Bat Shlomo Vineyards, a boutique winery, was established by Elie Wurtman and Ari Erle.

References

Moshavim
Hitahdut HaIkarim
Populated places established in 1889
Jewish villages in Mandatory Palestine
Populated places in Haifa District
1889 establishments in the Ottoman Empire
1880s establishments in Ottoman Syria
Jewish villages in the Ottoman Empire